The 2022 season for  is the 15th season in the team's existence, and its second as a UCI WorldTeam and under the current name. They use Cube bicycles, Shimano drivetrain, Newmen wheels and Santic clothing.

Team roster 

Riders who joined the team for or during the 2022 season

Riders who left the team during or after the 2021 season

Season victories

National, Continental, and World Champions

Notes

References

External links 

 

Intermarché-Wanty-Gobert Matériaux
Intermarché-Wanty-Gobert Matériaux
Intermarché–Wanty–Gobert Matériaux